PT-109 is a naval simulation video game developed by Digital Illusions and Spectrum HoloByte in 1987 for the Macintosh and MS-DOS. This game is roughly based on the events involving the Motor Torpedo Boat PT-109.

Plot
The game starts in the practice-tactics mode. In this mode, new players learn how to operate the boat, fire torpedoes, read radar on different displays, when to use the engine muffler for a quieter approach, how to operate smoke screens, and how to find other weaponry. Players also learn the history of the craft, as some patrol boats can be piloted only during specific stages of World War II. Additional features of the game include four difficulty levels, radio messages to the player's base for additional air or ship support, automatic pilot, and assigned patrols.

Development
A remake of PT-109, called PT Boat Simulator, was released for DOS PC in 1994.

Reception
A Computer Gaming World reviewer in 1988 called PT-109 "a remarkable achievement", but stated that he no longer played the game because he had played all of the preprogrammed patrols several times and knew what would happen. He recommended using the practice mode to become familiar with the game, instead of the lowest difficulty level, to maximize its lifetime. 1991 and 1993 surveys of strategy and war games gave it two and a half stars out of five. In 1988, Dragon gave the Macintosh version of the game 4 out of 5 stars. They gave the MS-DOS version 4½ out of 5 stars.

References

External links

1987 video games
Classic Mac OS games
DOS games
Spectrum HoloByte games
Video games developed in the United States